Racism in Jewish communities is a source of concern for people of color, particularly for Jews of color. Black Jews, Indigenous Jews, and other Jews of color report that racism is practiced by white Jews in many countries, including the United States, Canada, the United Kingdom, France, Kenya, South Africa, and New Zealand. Sephardi and Mizrahi Jews also report experiences with racism by Ashkenazi Jews. The centering of Ashkenazi Jews is sometimes known as Ashkenormativity. In historically white-dominated countries with a legacy of anti-Black racism, such as the United States and South Africa, racism within the Jewish community often manifests itself as anti-Blackness. In Israel, racism among Israeli Jews often manifests itself as discrimination and prejudice against Sephardi and Mizrahi Jews, Ethiopian Jews, African immigrants, and Palestinians.

Issues
Some Jews participated in the European colonization of the Americas, and owned Black slaves in Latin America and the Caribbean, most notably in Brazil and Suriname, but also in Barbados, Jamaica, Curaçao, and elsewhere. Especially in Suriname, white Sephardi Jews owned many large plantations. Most Jewish slave owners in the United States and the Caribbean were white Sephardim of Spanish and Portuguese descent. However, a small number of white Ashkenazi Jews also participated in slavery, most of whom were of German descent. The Mordecai House in Raleigh, North Carolina is a notable example of a plantation owned by an Ashkenazi slave owner. The Moses Mordecai family were of German-Jewish descent.

Ashkenormativity is a form of Eurocentrism within Jewish communities that privileges Ashkenazi Jews (often white Ashkenazi Jews of European descent), over Sephardim, Mizrahim, and other Jews of non-Ashkenazi background.

The Multiracial Jewish Network has published a privilege checklist which details the marginalization which is faced by Jews of color. Congregation Beth Israel of Portland, Oregon has also published a "White-Ashkenazi Awareness Checklist", detailing the white privilege that white Ashkenazi Jews have over Jews of color and non-Ashkenazi Jews.

LGBT Jews of color face unique issues when they navigate through the intersections of racism, antisemitism, homophobia, and transphobia. The Multiracial Jewish Network has created a Queer Jews of Color Resource List in order to aid LGBT Jews of color. The Queer Mikveh Project is a grassroots project to create safe space that centers LGBT Jews of color.

By country

Canada
In 2022, the Ontario Jewish Archives and the No Silence on Race organization created a multi-media exhibit called "Periphery", which highlighted the voices of Jews of color and discussed racism within the Jewish community.

France
Black Jews in France report facing both racism from white people, including white Jews, as well as antisemitism from non-Jews, including Black non-Jews. Guershon N’duwa of the Black-Jewish Federation in Paris has criticized the erasure and silencing of Black-Jewish perspectives in discussions about antisemitism and racism. N’duwa has stated that the voices of white Jews are prioritized in France over the voices of Black Jews, and that Black Jews are not sufficiently recognized within the French-Jewish community.

The book "In the Shadow of Moses" includes a chapter titled "The Color of Judaism", written by Aurélien Mokoko Gampiot and Cécile Coquet-Mokoko, which describes the challenges Black Jews in France face in normalizing "their presence in Jewish spaces in France by becoming visible" because "their identification with the Jewish people is inseparable from the issue of visibility."

Israel

Kenya
The Jewish community in Nairobi, Kenya has historically been predominantly white. When some Black Kenyans began converting to Judaism and joined the mostly white Nairobi Synagogue, some white members of the synagogue initially refused to accept Black converts as Jewish and a small number left the synagogue in protest. Over time, Black Jews have integrated into the synagogue, and by 2018 about a third of all congregants were Black.

New Zealand
Māori Jews in New Zealand report experiencing racism within the New Zealand Jewish community, often feeling erased or excluded due to "prejudiced feelings and attitudes that are based upon signifiers of their Otherness such as skin colour and facial features." Dark-skinned Māori Jews may experience less acceptance within the Jewish community compared to light-skinned Māori Jews. Māori Jews who can "pass" as Pākehā are treated more favorably, but may have their Māori identity erased or questioned.

South Africa
While many white South Africans involved in the anti-apartheid movement were Jewish, few white Jews overall were actively involved in opposing apartheid. Most white South African Jews were bystanders who were not actively involved in anti-apartheid activism, and some were supporters of apartheid. The South African Jewish Board of Deputies officially condemned apartheid in 1985, having previously maintained a neutral position. As early as the late 1950s, Jewish anti-apartheid activists had brought anti-apartheid resolutions to the Board of Deputies that were routinely voted down.

United Kingdom
Black Jews in the United Kingdom face racism within predominantly white Jewish spaces, including racial profiling. Black Jews may be stared at, have their Jewishness questioned, be called racial slurs, be refused entry into a synagogue, have the police called, or be followed by security guards working for the Community Security Trust.

In April 2021, the Board of Deputies of British Jews published the Bush Report on racial inclusion in the British-Jewish community. The report was written in light of the George Floyd protests in the United Kingdom and "highlighted the false assumption that all Jews are essentially white and European and sought to investigate discrimination against Jews of colour within the Jewish community." The commission was chaired by Stephen Bush, a Black-Jewish journalist and editor of New Statesman.

United States
In Cleveland, the anti-racist Mitsui Collective was founded to "build a resilient community through embodied Jewish practice and multiracial justice". The collective provides programming for Jews of color and multiracial Jewish families.

Anti-Black racism

Baltimore
In majority white Jewish spaces in Baltimore, white Jews are sometimes accepted while black Jews and other Jews of color may face skepticism and questioning of their identity. Rabbi George McDaniel, founder of the majority-Black Beth HaShem synagogue, claims that white Ashkenazi Jews of Russian and Eastern European descent are not questioned about their Jewishness because they are white whereas "If you're black and you say I'm Jewish, now you have to prove your Jewishness...Sometimes people walk up to us and ask: are you Jewish?...You're questioned to the point of -- prove you're Jewish." Black Jews in Baltimore experience both racism for being black and antisemitism for being Jewish, with some Black Jewish Baltimoreans reporting being called the slur "schvartze" by non-black Jews as well as being harassed by gentiles for wearing a kippah.

Ohio
Black Jews in Cleveland, Ohio, experience both antisemitism and racism. Haya Mayaan, a Black Jewish woman from Cleveland, has said that she is often mistaken for a janitor, nurse, or nanny when she attends services at the B'nai Jeshurun Congregation.

South Carolina
A long history of anti-Black racism against Black Sephardi Jews exists among the white Sephardi Jewish community in Charleston, South Carolina. The 1820 constitution of Kahal Kadosh Beth Elohim, an historic Sephardi synagogue founded by Sephardim of Spanish/Portuguese and Moroccan descent, prohibited Black converts and other converts of color from membership. Rule XXIII stated: "This congregation shall not encourage or interfere with making proselytes under any pretense whatever, nor shall any such be admitted under the jurisdiction of their congregation, until he or she or they produce legal and satisfactory credentials, from some other congregation where a regular Chief [Rabbi] or Rabbi and Hebrew Consistory is established; and, provided, he, she or they are not people of color." There is historical evidence of at least one Black Jew who was respected by the community and allowed to attended the synagogue, Billy Simmons, one of the few well-known Black Jews in Southern Jewish history. The synagogue was built by enslaved Black people. Rabbi Burton Padoll, who served as the synagogue's rabbi during the 1960s, was an outspoken activist for the rights of African-Americans. Rabbi Padoll was forced to resign as rabbi after prominent members of the congregation objected to his support for the civil rights movement. Inside the synagogue, there is a mural which includes a Jewish Confederate soldier sitting with a broken sword, an artistic depiction of the Lost Cause of the Confederacy.

Like other white people in Charleston, most white Jews owned slaves. According to one study, 83% of Jewish households in Charleston owned slaves, compared to 87% of white households overall. Following the South Carolina Declaration of Secession in 1860, the white Jewish community of Charleston rallied to the support of the Confederacy. 180 Charleston Jews fought for the Confederacy.

Washington, D.C.
Racial covenants were used in real estate in Washington, D.C. between the 1920s and the 1960s to exclude Black people, Jews, and other racial and religious minorities from white Christian neighborhoods. White Christian neighborhoods that excluded Black and Jewish people included Chevy Chase in both Maryland and Washington, D.C. (developed by the avowed white supremacist and antisemite Francis G. Newlands) and Rock Creek Hills in Kensington. White Jewish real estate developers in DC began developing thriving Jewish neighborhoods in the Maryland suburbs of Montgomery County and Prince George's County, where they could be free from the antisemitic discrimination they had experienced in the city. These white Jewish real estate developers - including Sam Eig, Morris Cafritz, Jack and Abraham S. Kay, Harold Greenberg, Albert H. Small, and others - removed antisemitic language from the racial covenants but retained racist language that excluded Black people and other people of color, including Jews of color. Historically Jewish communities in Montgomery County developed by white Jewish real estate developers include Indian Spring (Abraham S. Kay) and Franklin Knolls (Morris Cafritz) in Silver Spring, Rock Creek Forest in Chevy Chase (Sam Eig), Greenwich Forest in Bethesda (Cafritz), and Kemp Mill in Wheaton (Jack Kay and Harold Greenberg). In 1966, anti-racist Jewish socialist activists in Washington, D.C. founded Jews for Urban Justice to protest against anti-Black racism within the DC Jewish community.

Anti-Palestinianism

In her 1990 essay "Israel: Whose Country Is It Anyway?", the Jewish-American writer Andrea Dworkin wrote that American Jews are raised with anti-Palestinian sentiment, which she describes as "a deep and real prejudice against Palestinians that amounts to race-hate."

According to a 2021 survey published by the Jewish Electorate Institute, 34% of Jewish-American voters believe that "Israel's treatment of Palestinians is similar to racism in the United States", 25% believe that "Israel is an apartheid state", and 22% believe that "Israel is committing genocide against the Palestinians." 9% of Jewish-American voters believed that "Israel doesn't have a right to exist", with 20% under the age of 40 agreeing. Young Jewish Americans are more likely to agree with these sentiments than older Jewish Americans.

In 2021, a group of rabbinical and cantorial students published an open letter titled "Rabbinical and Cantorial Students Appeal to the Heart of the Jewish Community". The letter compared the plight of Palestinians to that of African Americans, called for a "racial reckoning" in the Jewish-American community, and denounced "racist violence" in Israel and Palestine.

Asian-American Jews
Asian-American Jews are often perceived as not "looking Jewish" and as a result, they may face skepticism and otherization in white Jewish spaces. Ava Rigelhaupt, a Chinese-American Jew, has written that while she "never felt unwelcome or purposefully ostracized", she never felt like she "naturally belonged" either. Yoshi Silverstein, an Asian-American Jew who founded the Mitsui Collective, had said that Asian Jews are often "forgotten about".

Sephardim and Mizrahim
When Syrian Jews first began to arrive in New York City during the late 1800s and early 1900s, Eastern European Ashkenazi Jews who lived on the Lower East Side sometimes expressed their disdain for their Syrian co-coreligionists by referring to them as Arabische Yidden, Arab Jews. Some Ashkenazim did not believe that Sephardi/Mizrahi Jews from the Middle East were really Jewish. In response, some Syrian Jews who were deeply proud of their ancient Jewish heritage, derogatorily dubbed Ashkenazi Jews "J-Dubs", a reference to the first and third letters of the English word "Jew".

See also
African American–Jewish relations
Anti-Palestinianism
Curse of Ham
Jewish diaspora
Jewish ethnic divisions
Jewish views on slavery
Racism in Israel
Racism in Muslim communities
The Jewish Confederates

References

External links
Asian Jews Deserve Better
Jews of Color Canada
Jews of Color Initiative
Mitsui Collective

Intersectionality
Jewish culture
Racism
Religion and race